Penneswaraar Temple, also known as Penneswaramadam Shiva Temple, is a Shiva temple in the Krishnagiri district in India. It was built by Kulothunga Chola III in the year 1188 C.E. (9th Century C.E.) after defeating the Hoysala Dynasyty of present day Karnataka region. It is located in Penneswaramadam, Kaveripattinam Town near Talihalli, Krishnagiri District. The temple is right next to the Thenpennai River which originates from Nandi Hills. This Temple exists as the origin for Bharadwaja Gotra, an ethnic group of Brahmins in Tamil Nadu who where descendants of later Pallavas (Pallava Dynasty), who had previous origin of Penna River in Andhra Pradesh. The Temple has the highest number of sculptures of Navakanda within the state of Tamil Nadu.

The 7-tiered Rajagopuram, which is the largest in the Krishnagiri District, is told to be built by the Aadhiyaman. The temple has the inscriptions regarding the port of Madras (Madrasapattinam), as well as information regarding digging canal in Madrasapattinam during the time of Kampanna II. It has the statue of Kulothunga Chola III as a proof and tribute to the constructor of the temple. It is said that Parashurama prayed to Lord Shiva in Penneswaramadam to offset his sin of killing his mother.

History 
The Temple has various inscriptions of different periods by different kings and empires who ruled this part of India. Its been identified that around 42 inscription stones been found and many navakandam sculptures also found. There is another interesting inscription of Veera Ramanathan the Hoysala Dynasyty King of 13th century AD, which tells that the person who beg in the jurisdiction of the king will be killed. This also represents that the king was conscious on availability of food for every people in his empire also the fact written in the inscription is that it was written in 41 years of the king Ramanatha. In 12th Century AD, there was a tevaram palli (school) which still has sites and space remains of the school which is identified through the inscriptions available in the temple. This temple has the inscription which details about the wife name of Raja Raja Chola III which is inscripted as "Vanakovar aiyer Mahalal Koothadum Devanatchiya" who has lighted a lamp in the temple which also has the special inscription of Cholas has been found in this temple with their symbol " tiger ".

Nomenclature 

Kulothunga chola III is believed to be the first person to commission the temple and call it Penneswaraar temple. Later, it became the Penneswaramadam Shiva Temple due to past presence of Cheraman Perumal Madam in 13th century. The 18th century inscription in the temple tells that the mandapam cielling was by vellapa Nadan Mecheri Kandan Kanda chetty.

See also 
 Pallava Dynasty
 Bodhidharma
 Bharadvaja

References 

Temples in India
Shiva temples in Krishnagiri district
Hindu temples